Voetbalvereniging Berkum is a football club from Zwolle, Netherlands. Berkum is currently competing in the Saturday Hoofdklasse B league. The club plays home games at the De Vegtlust ground. Berkum has played in the Round of 32 of the KNVB Cup, most recently in 2015–16.

Current squad

References

External links
 Official site

Association football clubs established in 1961
1961 establishments in the Netherlands
Football clubs in the Netherlands
Football clubs in Zwolle